Matthew James Lawrence (born 19 June 1974) is an English former footballer who played as a centre back.

Playing career
Lawrence began his career as a midfielder, starting out late at Grays Athletic in August 1995, age 21, having taken an American literature degree, whilst playing college football (soccer, to distinguish from American football) in the United States for Hartwick College. In February 2009, Hartwick inducted Lawrence into the school's Athletic Hall of Fame.

Five months later, Lawrence became a Football League player, when he joined Wycombe Wanderers for £20,000. He made 21 appearances for Wycombe before moving on to Fulham, for an undisclosed fee. He spent 20 months at the west London side, making over 60 appearances, before going back to Wycombe on a free transfer following Fulham's failure to gain promotion to Division One.

He had a more successful spell at The Chairboys this time, before going to Millwall in March 2000 for £200,000. At Millwall, he began a new role as a right-back, and starred, only missing one game and being voted the fans' Player of The Year, as Millwall were promoted to Division One as champions in 2000–01 season. He started the 2001–02 season well, but sustained a concussion, the results of which kept him out of the side for some time. On his return, he found his best form to date for the club, as they reached the Division One play-offs.

At the start of the 2003–04 campaign, Lawrence fell out with Lions boss Mark McGhee, and looked to be on his way out of The New Den. However, McGhee was replaced by Dennis Wise, and Lawrence got his place back. It was then that he switched to central defence, playing alongside Darren Ward, and the duo stood out, with the Lions reaching the 2004 FA Cup Final, for which Lawrence was captain, and thus qualifying for the UEFA Cup.

Wise left the club at the end of the 2004–05 season, and defensive partner Ward left for Crystal Palace, and Lawrence found himself playing in a number of positions, under a variety of different managers, during the disastrous 2005–06 campaign, as the Lions were relegated back to League One.

Nigel Spackman was appointed manager at the New Den, but Lawrence did not play competitively under him, as he moved to rivals Crystal Palace to rekindle his partnership with Darren Ward. After an average first season, Lawrence began to excel under the leadership of Neil Warnock at Selhurst Park. He scored his first goal for Palace against Sheffield Wednesday on 22 March 2008. His contract at Selhurst Park expired at the end of the 2009–10 season, and in August 2010 he joined Gillingham of League Two on a one-year deal, and made his debut for them in goalless draw away to Hereford United on 14 August.

In July 2012 he joined non-League side Whitehawk.

Life outside football
In preparation for the 2007–08 season, Lawrence wrote a weekly "pre-season diary" for The London Paper. This appeared every Monday for five weeks, a popular piece which led to him being given a regular column in the matchday programme over the season. He was signed up to write a weekly column for The Mirror.

Lawrence joined the Sporting Kansas City broadcast team as a color commentator ahead of the 2017 Major League Soccer season.

Honours
Fulham

 Football League Third Division: 1996–97

Millwall
 Football League Second Division: 2000–01
 FA Cup runner-up: 2003–04
Individual

 Millwall Player of the Season: 2000–01
 PFA Team of the Year: Second Division 2000–01

References

External links
Matt Lawrence player profile at cpfc.co.uk

1974 births
Living people
English footballers
Footballers from Northampton
Association football defenders
Hartwick Hawks men's soccer players
Grays Athletic F.C. players
Wycombe Wanderers F.C. players
Fulham F.C. players
Millwall F.C. players
Crystal Palace F.C. players
Gillingham F.C. players
Whitehawk F.C. players
Burgess Hill Town F.C. players
English Football League players
FA Cup Final players